Mona Faiz Montrage (born 26 June 1992) better known by her stage name as Mona 4Reall or Hajia4Reall is a Ghanaian socialite, model, musician, and businesswoman.

Early life and education 
Hajia4Reall was born and raised in Tamale, the northern part of Ghana alongside her siblings to a Ghanaian mother and a Lebanese father. She had her elementary education in Tamale before proceeding to Labone Senior High School for her secondary school education. She moved to the US where she studied at the Art Institute of New York City, US majoring in Fashion and design.

Career

Business 
In July 2017, Mona 4Reall launched a women's cosmetics brand with the name 4Real Beauty. She also owns an event and entertainment company based in New York. The company specializes in event planning, multimedia production, and talent management. The company gained prominence after it organized one of Accra's biggest End of Year Party, the Global Wave party in 2016.

She has starred in music videos for artists including Shatta Wale on his song Bullet Proof.

Music 
Mona 4Reall released her first single in November 2020 titled "Badder Than", the song was produced by Ghanaian award-winning producer, M.O.G. Beatz. In January 2021, she released her song single Fine Girl produced by Kuami Eugene. In May 2021, she released a third single produced by M.O.G. Beatz which featured Ghanaian YouTuber Kwadwo Sheldon. The following month, she released her fourth single titled Baby, which featured Dance hall musician Shata Wale.

On 6 October 2021, she announced the track-list for her upcoming maiden Extended Play (EP). The seven–track EP featured top artists including Shata Wale, Stonebwoy, Efya and Medikal with the tracks being produced either by M.O.G. Beatz, Richie Mensah, MixMaster Garzy and StreetBeatz, who are all award-winning producers. The EP was released on 15 October 2021, with six of their respective videos being premiered on her 4Real Entertainment YouTube Channel.

In 2022, she was nominated for Best New Artiste of the Year award and her music video for her song Fine Girl was nominated for Best Music Video of the Year at the Vodafone Ghana Music Awards 2022. She released a dancehall single titled, BLOWbyMona in 2022. She held her self named maiden concert in December 2021 which featured other known Ghanaian musicians.

Personal life 
Mona 4Reall got into the limelight initially for her relationship with Ghanaian businessman, Kennedy Agyapong known as Kenpong. The couple parted ways in August 2015. She has a daughter named Naila.

In 2020, on her 27th birthday she was dashed a brand-new Range Rover and a house located in Trassacco, an estate community in Accra.

Philanthropy 
In September 2021, Mona donated school supplies to students in the Bentum community after the Bentum D.A Basic school asked for support in a viral video.

Controversy 
In November 2022, Mona 4Reall was reportedly arrested in the United Kingdom for an alleged money laundering issue.

Discography

Albums and mixtapes 
 Here To Stay (EP) (2021)

Singles 
 Badder Than (2020)
 Fine Girl (2021)
 God's Child (2021)
 Baby ft. Shatta Wale (2021)

Awards and nominations

References 

Living people
Ghanaian Afrobeat musicians
21st-century Ghanaian women singers
Ghanaian women singers
21st-century Ghanaian singers
1992 births